Philip Joseph "Babe" Marchildon (October 25, 1913 – January 10, 1997) was a Canadian Major League Baseball pitcher.

Born in Penetanguishene, Ontario, Marchildon pitched 1,214 innings with a won-lost record of 68 wins and 75 losses and a career ERA of 3.93 for the Philadelphia Athletics and the Boston Red Sox from 1940 to 1942 and from 1945 to 1950.

All but one of his 185 MLB games pitched came in an A's uniform. Marchildon had two standout seasons for Philadelphia, going 17–14 for the 1942 Athletics and 19–9 (3.22) for the 1947 edition. His 17 victories in 1942 accounting for nearly a third of all of Philadelphia's season total of 55 wins; the A's finished eighth and last in the American League that season. He led the league in bases on balls and placed ninth in Most Valuable Player Award balloting in both 1942 and 1947.

During World War II Marchildon served in the Royal Canadian Air Force as a tail gunner in a Halifax bomber and was later a prisoner of war at the infamous Stalag Luft III in Germany for the final nine months of the war.

Marchildon was named to Canada's Sports Hall of Fame in 1976, then was inducted into the Canadian Baseball Hall of Fame in 1983, in its initial year, and the Penetanguishene Sports Hall of Fame, in the city of his birth, in 1987.

Marchildon was later inducted into the Ontario Sports Hall of Fame in 1996.

He died in Toronto on January 10, 1997, at age 83.

References

External links

 Phil Marchildon - Baseballbiography.com

 Phil Marchildon of the Royal Canadian Air Force
 The Baseball Biography Project entry
 Baseball Almanac

1913 births
1997 deaths
Baseball people from Ontario
Boston Red Sox players
Buffalo Bisons (minor league) players
Canadian Baseball Hall of Fame inductees
Canadian expatriate baseball players in the United States
Canadian military personnel of World War II
Canadian prisoners of war in World War II
Cornwall Maple Leafs players
Franco-Ontarian people
Major League Baseball pitchers
Major League Baseball players from Canada
People from Penetanguishene
Philadelphia Athletics players
Toronto Maple Leafs (International League) players